Cucurbita foetidissima is a tuberous xerophytic plant found in the central and southwestern United States and northern Mexico. It has numerous common names, including: buffalo gourd, calabazilla, chilicote, coyote gourd, fetid gourd, fetid wild pumpkin, Missouri gourd, prairie gourd, stinking gourd, wild gourd, and wild pumpkin. The type specimen was collected from Mexico by Alexander von Humboldt and Aimé Bonpland sometime before 1817. In Latin, foetidissima means ill smelling.

The buffalo gourd has evolved in the semiarid regions and is well-adapted to desert environments. It contains high amounts of protein and carbohydrates and yields abundant oil. The carbohydrates that are formed in the tap root have led to the idea of growing the plant for biofuel.

The fruit is consumed by both humans and animals. When mature, a stage marked by increasing desiccation of vine, leaves, fruit-stem, and fruit, the fruit begins its final gourd stage.

Geographic location and genetics make it highly likely that Cucurbita scabridifolia  originated as a naturally occurring hybrid of C. foetidissima and Cucurbita pedatifolia.

Morphology and cultivation
Cucurbita foetidissima requires little water and grows best in semiarid and arid environments. Warm weather is required during the five- to eight-month vegetation period. This perennial is well adapted to marginal agricultural lands such as sandy loam soils which have to be well-drained. Germination temperature range is between 15 °C and 37 °C with an optimum at 25 °C.

The maximum depth for a successful germination is 12 cm. The germination is possible in a pH range from 2.2 (germination rate 15%) up to pH 8 (germination rate 90%). Asexual propagation is possible from nodal roots.

The flowers are borne singly at the nodes of the vines after a certain amount of annual vegetative growth has taken place.

The fruit weighs 120 g to 150 g, with 292 to 315 seeds per fruit. The seeds often remain viable for months or even years within an undamaged gourd. One hectare of plants can produce 2.5 tons of seed.

The plant forms a fleshy tap root which is used as a storage and overwintering structure.

Distribution
Cucurbita foetidissima is native to North America. It is found in the central and southwestern United States, in: Arizona, Arkansas, southern California, Colorado, Kansas, Missouri, southern Nebraska, southern Nevada, New Mexico, Oklahoma, Texas, and southern Utah. In Mexico, it can be found in Aguascalientes, Chihuahua, Coahuila, Guanajuato, Guerrero, Hidalgo; northern Jalisco, Mexico; Nuevo León, Querétaro, San Luis Potosí, Sonora, Tamaulipas, and Zacatecas.

Uses
The buffalo gourd has the potential of being a crop adapted to arid to semiarid lands.

Food
Fresh gourd: The fresh young gourd can be eaten like squash. The mature fruit is no longer edible, due to bitter compounds.
Seeds: Eaten after being prepared by roasting or boiling.
Oil: The extractable oil content in whole seeds reaches from 24.3% to 50%. Linoleic acid, an essential polyunsaturated fatty acid, comprises 38% to 65% of the oil. A characterization of the oils from buffalo gourd indicates that this oil is similar to other common edible oils.
Protein: Whole Buffalo gourd seeds contain approximately 31% crude protein, which is usable for human consumption and for feed. 
Starch: Is mainly located in the tap root which forms after the first year of growth. The starch content in the dried root is between 47.5% and 56%.
Fodder: Fresh leaves or the whole plants can be used as animal food.
Commercial Products: Besides food, the protein can be used for industrial purposes (water paints, paper coating, adhesives and textile sizing). 
Biofuel: Biodiesel can be produced from the oil in the seeds. But the main interest to produce renewable fuels is to produce biofuel with the carbohydrates which are located in the tap root.
Medical: The Zuni people use a poultice of powdered seeds, flowers and saliva for swellings.
Cleaning: C. foetidissima contains a saponin that can be obtained from the fruit and root. In the Cahuilla Native American culture, the fruit and other parts of the plant have been used for their saponin content as laundry soap by rubbing plant parts against dirty clothing. However, prolonged contact can cause skin irritation.

Pests 
Various insects may penetrate the hard skin of the gourd. External structures appear to prevent damage by most insects and the plant is highly resistant to cucumber beetle and squash bug. White molds seem to result in smooth surface areas and black molds often form circular patterns.

Gallery

References

External links 
photo of herbarium specimen at Missouri Botanical Garden, collected in northeastern Mexico (probably Nuevo León) in 1847

foetidissima
Plants described in 1817
Flora of Mexico
Flora of the United States
Plants used in traditional Native American medicine
Squashes and pumpkins